H&R Real Estate Investment Trust is a Canadian open-ended real estate investment trust, specializing in commercial real estate, and based in Toronto, Ontario.  It is the third largest REIT in Canada by market capitalization (after RioCan and Choice Properties).  H&R's portfolio includes 40 office properties, 161 retail properties, and 105 industrial properties and 11 other properties, with a total value of $13 billion.  It is listed on the Toronto Stock Exchange.

History 
H&R was founded in 1996 by Thomas J. Hofstedter, through a $173 million IPO on the Toronto Stock Exchange.  The original assets of the trust were office buildings owned by Hofstedter's family firm.

In February 2007, H&R agreed to become the developer and owner of The Bow, Encana's new Calgary headquarters complex.  It paid $70 million for the land, and Encana signed a 25-year lease.  Construction was briefly halted in December 2008 due to a $400 million shortage of financing needed to finish the job.  The project continued to move forward, despite the unresolved financing issues. In April 2009, a secondary tower in the project, the  building planned for a block south of the main tower, was put on hold for at least two years.  Construction on the main tower, however, continued, having secured the remaining $475 million required for completion of the structure.  H&R had to cut its monthly distribution by half as a result of the financing.

In May 2012, the trust purchased 1/3 of Scotia Plaza, in co-ordination with Dundee REIT, who purchased the other 2/3.  The total purchase price was $1.27 billion.  In June 2016, H&R sold its stake in Scotia Plaza.

Primaris REIT 

In January 2013, H&R offered to purchase Primaris REIT, a Canadian REIT primarily owning enclosed shopping malls, for $2.7 billion, or $27.5 a share.  Primaris had previously received a hostile takeover offer led by KingSett Capital for $26 a share.  Primaris, originally called Borealis Retail REIT, had been founded through a spin-off of several retail properties owned by the Ontario Municipal Employees System in 2003.  It owned 43 enclosed shopping malls at the time of the proposed acquisition, while H&R primarily owned office buildings and power centres.  H&R and KingSett eventually agreed to split Primaris between them, with H&R getting approximately 25 properties worth $3.1 billion and rights to the Primaris name, while the KingSett group received 18 properties worth $1.8 billion.  With the reduced deal, H&R failed to become the largest Canadian REIT, as it would have been under the initial deal.

Recent History 

In December 2014, the company sold 50% ownership in a portfolio of industrial properties for $731 million.  In November 2017, the company announced that it planned to sell 91 of its US retail and industrial properties, for a total of US$895 million.  Money from the sales would go in part to buy US residential properties.  In recent years, the company has experienced poor financial results, due in part to the closures of Target Canada and Sears Canada.
If you searching for H&R REIT Customer Service Number, you are at the right place. In this post, we have provided a list of H&R REIT Customer Service Phone Numbers. You can call H&R REIT Customer Support the H&R REIT 800 Phone Number given here and solve your queries.

Properties 

H&R has a diversified portfolio of properties (it claims to be Canada's largest diversified REIT).  Over the past five years (as of 2019) H&R has been changing its portfolio profile. Multi-residential properties accounted for 23% of its portfolio, up from 1% in 2014. Over the same period, retail decreased from 39% to 28%, office decreased from 51% to 41%, and industrial has remained at approximately 8%.  United States market exposure increased to 42%, up from 23% in 2014. Canadian markets declined from 77% to 58%, with Ontario accounting for 28% as of 2019. 

Prominent office properties owned by H&R include The Bow (Calgary), the TransCanada Tower (Calgary), the Atrium (Toronto), Corus Quay (Toronto), and Hess Tower (Houston).

Most of H&R's Canadian retail properties are in its Primaris subsidiary.  Notable malls owned by Primaris include Sunridge Mall (Calgary), Orchard Park (Kelowna), Place D'Orleans (Ottawa), Dufferin Mall (Toronto), Cataraqui Centre (Kingston), Place du Royaume (Chicoutimi), Stone Road Mall (Guelph), Medicine Hat Mall (Medicine Hat), Park Place Mall (Lethbridge), Kildonan Place (Winnipeg), Sherwood Park Mall (Sherwood Park), Grant Park Shopping Centre (Winnipeg), and St. Albert Centre (St. Albert).

H&R also owns multi-family residential properties, primarily in the southern US, and partially under its Lantower Residential subsidiary.

References 

Companies based in Toronto
Real estate companies of Canada
Companies listed on the Toronto Stock Exchange
Real estate investment trusts of Canada